Thomas McCrae may refer to:

 Thomas McCrae (politician) (died 1814), farmer, innkeeper and political figure in Upper Canada
 Thomas McCrae (physician) (1870–1935), professor of medicine at Jefferson Medical College